Start Up Citywide is an agency funded through the British Government's Neighbourhood Renewal Fund and is located in Stoke on Trent, Staffordshire, England.

NRF monies, allocated to multi-agency Local Strategic Partnerships (LSPs) in areas assessed as suffering from the greatest levels of deprivation, aim to support social regeneration and to reduce relative deprivation in those areas (such as health inequalities, educational underachievement and high crime rates).

Start Up Citywide addresses the educational underachievement and worklessness strands amongst others, and works with parents of children up to age 16 to help them re-engage with training and move them closer to, and into, employment.  To date well over 2000 parents within Stoke-on-Trent have been service-users, receiving advice and guidance on a one-to-one basis on training and employment related issues.

Part of Stoke-on-Trent and North Staffordshire YMCA, Start Up Citywide has a partnership agreement with Stoke-on-Trent City Council to offer services from Phase I Children's Centres within the City.  This means that the agency's support workers are available throughout the City and help work to address issues of worklessness.

Barriers which prevent parents moving into training and work are identified and an individual action plan is developed by the service-user's support worker.  Advice is then given and referrals are made, where appropriate, to other agencies who can help with the process.  Courses are also offered by the programme and support is given to remove barriers such as childcare costs and transport.

History 
Between 2003 and October 2006, the agency's lead and accountable body was North Stoke Primary Care Trust (NSPCT).  During this time, the NSPCT was responsible for a number of Sure Start (Wave 5) programmes in the city. Sure Start is a UK Government initiative, originating in the Treasury, with the aim of "giving children the best possible start in life".

Start Up Citywide came into being when best practice of two smaller-scale projects based with Sure Start Centres at Abbey Bucknall/Bentilee and Longton were combined.  These two projects were known as Work-Start (funded by the European Social Fund), and Start Up Longton South (funded by the European Regional Development Fund) respectively.

In 2005, the union between the two was made and new funding was confirmed by the Local Strategic Partnership.  Funding of Phase I of the citywide programme closed in the Summer of 2006 but due to strong performance, funding was again extended to April 2008.  With the reconfiguration of Children's Centres (which now came under the remit of Stoke-on-Trent City Council) Start Up Citywide's lead and accountable body shifted to the Stoke-on-Trent and North Staffordshire YMCA as a clear strategic fit was identified.  However, the agency continues to have strong ties with the Children's Centres and work continues to take place from these centres.

In January 2008 Start Up Citywide once again received additional funding from the European Social Fund to extend the programme's work into Summer 2008 and between 2009 and 2011 continued through the Working Neighbourhoods Fund.

The service was recently named subcontractor for the Government's flagship Work Programme, offering services across Stoke-on-Trent and North Staffordshire to support long-termed unemployed adults into sustainable employment.

External links 
Official site

Organisations based in Stoke-on-Trent